Hankinson's equation (also called Hankinson's formula or Hankinson's criterion) is a mathematical relationship for predicting the off-axis uniaxial compressive strength of wood.  The formula can also be used to compute the fiber stress or the stress wave velocity at the elastic limit as a function of grain angle in wood.   For a wood that has uniaxial compressive strengths of  parallel to the grain and  perpendicular to the grain, Hankinson's equation predicts that the uniaxial compressive strength of the wood in a direction at an angle  to the grain is given by

Even though the original relation was based on studies of spruce, Hankinson's equation has been found to be remarkably accurate for many other types of wood.  A generalized form of the Hankinson formula has also been used for predicting the uniaxial tensile strength of wood at an angle to the grain.  This formula has the form

where the exponent  can take values between 1.5 and 2.

The stress wave velocity at angle  to the grain at the elastic limit can similarly be obtained from the Hankinson formula

See also 

 Material failure theory
 Linear elasticity
 Hooke's law
 Orthotropic material
 Transverse isotropy

References

Materials science
Solid mechanics
Equations